Chartzufim or HaChartzufim (Hebrew: החרצופים; a portmanteau made from the words Partzufim, faces, and Chatzufim, audacious)  was an Israeli political satire television programme in the vein of Britain's Spitting Image. It ran from 1996 to 2001 on Channel 2.

Puppet List

 Hafez al-Assad
 Yasser Arafat
 Ehud Barak
 Yossi Beilin
 Shlomo Ben-Ami
 Binyamin Ben-Eliezer
 Avraham Burg
 Bill Clinton
 Arye Dari
 Ya'akov Eilon
 Aviv Geffen
 Miki Haimovich
 Dalia Itzik
 Avigdor Kahalani
 Yosef Lapid
 Limor Livnat
 David Levy
 Avigdor Lieberman
 Amnon Lipkin-Shahak
 Dan Meridor
 Amram Mitzna
 Ariel Sharon
 Roni Milo
 Shaul Mofaz
 Yitzhak Mordechai
 Hosni Mubarak
 Yaakov Neeman
 Benjamin Netanyahu
 Ehud Olmert
 Shimon Peres
 Amir Peretz
 Yitzhak Rabin
 Haim Ramon
 Saddam Hussein
 Yossi Sarid
 Moshe Shahal
 Natan Sharansky
 Dan Shilon
 Yigal Shilon
 Ahmad Tibi
 Orly Weinerman
 Ezer Weizman
 Shaul Yahalom
 Eli Yishay
 Ovadia Yosef

Staff
Directors: Yoav Tzafir, Yoram Zack, Avi Cohen
Created By: Ephraim Sidon
Puppets Designers: Itzik and Ilana Yahav
Puppeteers:Ilan Sabir, Ofira Archoni, Gilles Ben David
Voices:Tuvia Tzafir, Sarit Sari, Tomer Sharon, Hannan Ladderman, Tzlil Biran, Avri Gilad, Yoav Tzafir

External links

Israeli television shows
Channel 2 (Israeli TV channel) original programming
Television sketch shows
Israeli television shows featuring puppetry
1990s Israeli television series
1996 Israeli television series debuts
2001 Israeli television series endings